Lee Sze Ho (born 15 July 1986) is a Hong Kong footballer who played for Hong Kong First Division club Eastern District as a defender.

Club career

Kwai Tsing
Lee started his football career at Kwai Tsing. However, he left the club after the 2005–06 season.

Hong Kong 08
Lee joined First Division club Hong Kong 08 in the 2006 summer.

Shatin
He joined Third Division club Shatin after spending a season at Hong Kong 08. He was one of the key members at the club to lead them gain promotion to First Division in two years.

Mutual
Lee joined Second Division club Pontic in 2010 summer, following former Shatin coach Lee Wai Man. The club successfully gained promotion to the First Division at the end of the season, but they refused to promote and thus were knocked out from the Hong Kong league system. Thus, Lee became a free agent.

Southern
Lee joined Second Division club Southern on a free transfer. His arrival had a great influence, as he led the club gain promotion to the First Division for the first time in club history.

Career stats

Club
 As of 13 May 2013

Notes
1.  Others include Hong Kong Third Division Champion Play-off.
2.  Since these clubs were competing in lower divisions, they could only join the Junior Shield instead of Senior Shield.

References

External links
 
 Lee Sze Ho at HKFA

1986 births
Living people
Hong Kong footballers
Association football defenders
Hong Kong First Division League players
Shatin SA players
Southern District FC players